Everyone Asks for Erika is a 1931 German musical comedy film directed by Frederic Zelnik and starring Lya Mara, Alexander Murski and Walter Janssen.

The film's sets were designed by the art director Robert Neppach.

Cast
Lya Mara as Erika Poliakoff
Alexander Murski as Poliakoff - her Dad
Walter Janssen as Kurt von Zeillern
Ernö Verebes as Otto Rebes - Redakteur
Ralph Arthur Roberts
Berthe Ostyn
Fritz Ley
Max Gülstorff
Paul Westermeier
Adele Sandrock
Charles Willy Kayser
Gretl Theimer
Viktor Franz
Karl Harbacher

References

External links

1931 musical comedy films
German musical comedy films
Films of the Weimar Republic
Films directed by Frederic Zelnik
German black-and-white films
1930s German films
1930s German-language films